Rasik Mohan Chakma (born in 1964) is an Indian politician and was the Chief Executive Member of the Chakma Autonomous District Council, an autonomous region in Mizoram since 9 October 2021. Rasik Mohan Chakma was born to Late Sukra Moni Chakma. He is a resident of Borapansury I, Lawngtlai district. He was the founder president of The Chakma District Mizo National Front (CDMNF).

Political career 
He has been representing Borapansury I MDC constituency as Member in Executive Committee of Chakma Autonomous District Council since 1993, except in 9th general election to Chakma Autonomous District Council held in 2013. 

In 2003 general election to Mizoram Legislative Assembly, he represented Tuichawng Assembly constituency.

Currently, Rasik Mohan Chakma is a member of the Chakma Autonomous District Council from Mizo National Front. Under his leader, the Mizo National Front has formed several Mizo National Front led government in Chakma Autonomous District Council. He has become the Chief Executive Member (CEM) of the Chakma Autonomous District Council (CADC) since 14 October 2021 by over throwing Shri Durjya Dhan Chakma.

Early life and education 
Before joining active politics, he served as a Post Master in Mizoram. He completed his graduation from Lunglei Government College (NEHU) in 1988.

Early political career 
He has served as the Chairman of Chakma Autonomous District Council.

Biography 
He was the twentieth Chief Executive Member (CEM) of CADC.

Positions held 

 2021–present: Elected as the Chief Executive Member (CEM) of the Chakma Autonomous District Council (CADC).

Role in the development of CADC 
During his tenure as the CEM of CADC, the Chawngte branch of State Bank of India, long bridges of Chawngte L and Chawngte P was initiated, which serve as the main lifeline of the people of Chakma Autonomous District Council.

References

External links
 https://www.cadc.gov.in/the-chief-executive-member

1964 births
Living people
Chakma people
Indian Buddhists
People from Lawngtlai district
Mizoram MLAs 2003–2008
Mizo National Front politicians